Linda Wong may refer to:
 Linda Wong (singer) (born 1968), Hong Kong singer and actress
 Linda Wong (pornographic actress) (1951–1987), American pornographic actress'

See also
 Linda Wang, American film and television actress